Christine Maria Verburg (25 February 1956 – 13 June 2020) was a Dutch television presenter and journalist. She is known for the magazine programme TROS Aktua.

Verburg started her career in 1979 as an announcer with TROS and became presenter of TROS Aktua in 1984. Later she also presented the game show TROS Triviant as well as Hollywood Boulevard and Lunch TV. In 2001 Verburg moved to commercial broadcasting company RTL before rejoining TROS in 2010.

She died after a long illness in June 2020.

References

1956 births
2020 deaths
Mass media people from Utrecht (city)
Dutch game show hosts
Dutch women television presenters
20th-century Dutch women
21st-century Dutch women